This is a  partial list of solar eclipses visible from the British Isles between AD 1AD 2091.

A solar eclipse occurs when the Moon passes between Earth and the Sun, thereby totally or partially obscuring Earth's view of the Sun. Below is a complete list of total and annular eclipses visible anywhere within the modern extent of the United Kingdom between AD 1 and AD 2090 and a description of forthcoming partial solar eclipses visible in Britain in the next fifteen years or so. For a complete list of solar eclipses visible from the United Kingdom between AD 1501 and AD 2500, see the Journal of the British Astronomical Association, February 2001.

5th century (401-500)
 16 April 413
 A total eclipse was visible in far southern Ireland, northern Wales, and the English Midlands. Totality lasted about 2 minutes.
 28 May 458
 Another total eclipse of similar duration (2:21), it followed a somewhat more oblique path, from South Wales to Lincolnshire. The point of greatest eclipse was located just east of Llandovery (then Alabum), where it occurred at about 11 in the morning.

7th century (601-700)
 1 May 664
 A total eclipse which was widely visible across the United Kingdom. It is the first eclipse for which there are recorded observations from England. Totality occurred at around 5:30 pm and lasted for over 2 minutes.

12th century (AD 1101 – 1200)
2 August 1133
 "King Henry's Eclipse": A total eclipse, recorded in the Peterborough Chronicle (under 1135 due to the vagaries of the dating system in use): and the next day, as he lay asleep on ship, the day darkened over all lands, and the Sun was all ** 
20 March 1140
 A total eclipse, recorded by William of Malmesbury in his Historia Novella. In his opinion this was a sign which foretold the capture of King Stephen in the Battle of Lincoln in 1141. This is the Lenten eclipse also reported in the Peterborough Chronicle as being on the thirteenth day before the kalends of April: '''After this, during Lent, the sun and the day darkened about the noon-tide of the day, when men were eating; and they lighted candles to eat by. That was the thirteenth day before the kalends of April. Men were greatly wonderstricken Totality was experienced at about 3:00pm at the centre line of the eclipse (near Derby).

15th to 16th centuries (AD 1401 – 1600)
26 June 1424
A total eclipse of almost 2 and a half minutes duration in the extreme north of Scotland, Orkney and Shetland.
17 June 1433
Another Scottish total eclipse from the Hebrides in the north-west to the English borders in the east and then a strip of the Yorkshire coast.
16 March 1485
Partial eclipse visible in London the same day as Richard III's queen, Anne Neville, died. Claimed as an ill omen by Richard's Tudor opponents. 
25 February 1598 (March 7, 1598 by Gregorian calendar)
A total eclipse with a diagonal track from Cornwall in the south-west to Aberdeen in the north-east of Scotland.

17th to 19th centuries (AD 1601–1900)
8 April 1652
Another total solar eclipse with a diagonal track, this time across Pembrokeshire, the Lake District and then Scotland from the south-west to the north-east, including most of the major cities.

12 August 1654
Yet another total eclipse for Scotland, this time a track across the north of Scotland near Aberdeen.
23 September 1699
A narrow path of totality just clipped the north-east corner of Scotland, including Wick.
3 May 1715
A marvellous British Total Solar Eclipse from Cornwall in the south-west to Lincolnshire and Norfolk in the east. Edmund Halley, (later the second man to be appointed Astronomer Royal), observed the eclipse from London. The city of London enjoyed 3 minutes 33 seconds of totality.
22 May 1724
A fine Total Solar Eclipse with a north-west to south-east track, from southern Wales and Devon in the west, eastwards to Hampshire and Sussex, but passing to the south of London.
There was no Total Solar Eclipse visible from the United Kingdom between 1724 and 1925.

20th century (AD 1901 – 2000)
24 January 1925
Total Solar Eclipse: A short duration total eclipse at sunset in British waters to the north of the Hebrides. Although it nowhere touched land, the path of totality ran very close to several outlying Scottish islands, including St Kilda; the islet of Sula Sgeir experienced 99.9% totality.
29 June 1927
Total Solar Eclipse: A mere 24 seconds of totality in the early morning, along a narrow track from North Wales, through Lancashire to the English north-east coast, but weather was very poor with cloud and high winds. However the Astronomer Royal's expedition to Giggleswick in North Yorkshire was amongst the few to catch sight of totality.
30 June 1954
Total Solar Eclipse at Unst in the Shetland Islands, although the centre line was north of British territorial waters. A large partial eclipse was widely observed over the whole of the UK.
2 October 1959
A partial eclipse visible over the whole of the United Kingdom ranging from approximately 20% in Northern Scotland to approximately 40% in South West Cornwall.
15 February 1961
The United Kingdom was greeted at dawn with a large portion of the Sun covered with maximum eclipse being approximately on the horizon ranging from 85% in Northern Scotland to between 92% and 95% in Southern England.
Partial solar eclipses also occurred on 20 May 1966, 22 September 1968, 25 February 1971, 10 July 1972, 30 June 1973, 11 May 1975, 29 April 1976, 20 July 1982, 15 December 1982, 4 December 1984, 21 May 1993 and 10 May 1994. (Source: HMNAO Eclipses On-line Portal.)
12 October 1996
A partial solar eclipse which covered 60% of the Sun over the British Isles.
11 August 1999
Total Solar Eclipse over Cornwall and part of south Devon, partial over the rest of the United Kingdom. Totality was observable from English Channel and the island of Alderney in the Channel Islands, but was almost universally clouded out on the British mainland. The clouds did clear in the Newquay area, though, allowing observation of full totality. A large partial eclipse was visible in the south-east of England and south Wales. Observers in various places noted birds falling silent, daylight colours turning to grey, and temperatures falling, augmented by a passing wisp of cloud at the moment of peak eclipse.

21st century (AD 2001 – 2100)
31 May 2003
An annular solar eclipse at sunrise was visible in the far north-west of Scotland.
3 October 2005
Partial eclipse approaching 75% partial in South West England.
29 March 2006
A small partial eclipse was visible across the country. South East England saw the greatest magnitude at around 30%, northern Scotland the least at around 15%. The eclipse was total in Libya and Turkey.
1 August 2008
A small partial eclipse over the whole of the UK as a total eclipse crosses central Russia east of the Urals. 40% in northern Scotland falling to less than 20% in the south-west of England.
4 January 2011
A partial eclipse, which was nowhere total, could be seen at sunrise in South East England, where with a favourable south-eastern horizon a Sun 75% covered by the Moon was seen.
20 March 2015
An eclipse which was total across the north Atlantic including the Faroe Islands resulted in a large partial eclipse across the UK, greater than 80% everywhere. While the line of totality didn't touch the mainland in the United Kingdom, it passed less than ten kilometres to the north-west of the island of Rockall.
21 August 2017
A total solar eclipse in parts of the USA results in a small partial eclipse visible at sunset.
11 August 2018
A very small partial eclipse, about 2%, on the northern coast of Scotland, Orkney and Shetland.
10 June 2021
An eclipse which was annular across Canada and the Arctic gave rise to partial eclipse across Britain ranging from 50% in northern Scotland to 30% in south-east England.
25 October 2022
An eclipse which is nowhere total results in a partial eclipse across Britain with north-east Scotland the most favoured, at around 35% falling to less than 20% in Cornwall.
8 April 2024
A partial eclipse may be visible from parts of Britain just before sunset.
29 March 2025
Partial ranging from 40% partial in Kent to about 50% partial in the north-west of Scotland.
12 August 2026
An eclipse which is total across Iceland, the Atlantic Ocean and Spain results in a very large partial eclipse across Britain with western Ireland the most favoured, at around 96% in Cornwall falling to 91% in Aberdeen.
2 August 2027
Partial ranging from about 30% partial in the north of Scotland to almost 60% partial in the south-west of England. Total eclipse from Gibraltar.
26 January 2028
About 40% partial  at sunset.
1 June 2030
About 50% partial at sunrise.
21 August 2036
60–70% partial, greatest in the north of Scotland.
16 January 2037
50–60% partial at sunrise, most in the north of Scotland.
5 January 2038
Less than 20% partial nationwide at sunset.
2 July 2038
Less than 20% partial nationwide.
21 June 2039
Over 60% partial, touching 80% in the north of Scotland.
11 June 2048
Annular passing just north of Shetland. Over 60% across mainland UK.
14 November 2050
Over 80% partial across all except south and south west of England. 
12 September 2053
40–60% partial, best in south.
5 November 2059
70–80% partial at sunrise, best in SW England.
3 September 2062
Partial grazing the north of Scotland, best in Shetland but still less than 20% partial.
5 February 2065
Partial; over 80% for whole UK. No totality.
21 April 2069
Partial eclipse, peaking at around 50% in NW Scotland.
12 September 2072
Limited partial eclipse peaking at around 40% in NE Scotland.
13 July 2075
Over 60% partial at sunrise nationally.
26 November 2076
Partial, between 40 and 60% partial
1 May 2079
Over 40% partial over 60% in NW Scotland.
3 September 2081
Totality in the Channel Islands, over 80% partial across England, Wales and Northern Ireland. Over 60% through Scotland. 
27 February 2082
60–80% partial at sunset, best in the south.
21 April 2088
Around 40–50% partial, best in the south east.
23 September 2090
Total Solar Eclipse: the next total eclipse visible in the UK follows a track similar to that of 11 August 1999, but shifted slightly further north and occurring very near sunset. Maximum duration in Cornwall will be 2 minutes and 10 seconds. Same day and month as the eclipse of 23 September 1699.
18 February 2091
Partial Solar Eclipse: viewable from most areas of the UK. It will be visible from 08:25 to 10:55am, and at its peak at around 09:30. From southern England about 55% of the Sun will be eclipsed. From northern Scotland, over 60% will be eclipsed. 
7 February 2092
40–50% partial at sunset.
23 July 2093
Annular eclipse over southern Scotland, Northern England and most of Northern Ireland. Over 80% partial for the rest of the country. Near the centre line, just over 5 minutes of annularity will be observed. The centre line runs roughly from Ayr to Newcastle.

22nd century (AD 2101 – 2200)
3 June 2133
Total eclipse over the far north-west of Scotland, including the Isles of Lewis, Harris, northern Skye and Shetland, partial eclipse elsewhere.  Maximum duration will be 3 minutes and 36 seconds.
7 October 2135
Total eclipse over central and southern Scotland and north-east England.  The centre line runs from the islands of Tiree and Mull, north of Glasgow and south of Edinburgh, through Livingston to Seahouses in Northumberland.  Maximum duration will be 4 minutes and 50 seconds.
14 June 2151
Total eclipse over south-west Scotland, Northern Ireland, the Isle of Man, north, central and eastern England and north-east Wales.  The centre line runs from the southern tip of the Kintyre peninsula in Argyll and Bute, through Lancashire, West and South Yorkshire, Lincolnshire and the Wash to the Suffolk coast.  Maximum duration will be 3 minutes and 48 seconds.
4 June 2160
Total eclipse over Land's End in Cornwall and the Scilly Isles, as well as the far southwestern tip of Ireland, partial eclipse elsewhere.    Maximum duration will be 2 minutes and 58 seconds.
8 November 2189
Total eclipse over Cornwall and south Devon and the Channel Islands, as well as southwest Ireland, partial eclipse elsewhere.  The centre line runs from Tralee, through Truro and passing just to the south of Jersey.  Maximum duration will be 4 minutes and 10 seconds.
14 April 2200
Total eclipse over Northern Ireland and northern England.  The centre line runs from Enniskillen, through Armagh, Downpatrick, the Isle of Man, Morecambe Bay and North Yorkshire to the East coast between Bridlington and Hornsea.  Maximum duration will be 1 minute and 23 seconds.

References

External links
 The NASA solar eclipse calculator for Europe
 List of solar eclipses in United Kingdom

Solar eclipses
United Kingdom
Historical events in the United Kingdom
Solar eclipses